Vernon J. Sneider (6 October 1916 – 1 May 1981) was an American novelist. His 1951 novel The Teahouse of the August Moon was later adapted for a Broadway play in 1953, a motion picture in 1956, and the Broadway musical Lovely Ladies, Kind Gentlemen in 1970.  John Patrick 's play The Teahouse of the August Moon won the Pulitzer Prize in Drama in 1954.

Sneider's novel A Pail of Oysters, about life during the White Terror under the Chinese Nationalists regime in Taiwan, was reissued by Camphor Press on February 28, 2016, the 69th anniversary of the 1947 2-28 Incident.

He was born and died in Monroe, Michigan. He was the son of Fred Sneider and Matilda D. Althaver Sneider. After graduating from the University of Notre Dame in 1940, he entered the Army. He was a member of a military government team that landed in Okinawa in April 1945. There he became commander of Tobaru, a village of 5,000 people that became Tobiki Village in The Teahouse. He was married first to Barbara Lee Cook (1925–1968).

Bibliography

References

 
Mrs. June Sneider, The widow of Vern Sneider, holds copyrights for his works. She can be reached by mail at:
210 W. Cross Street, # 148, Ypsilanti, Michigan 48197

External links
 
 

1916 births
1981 deaths
20th-century American novelists
American male novelists
People from Monroe, Michigan
20th-century American male writers
Novelists from Michigan